The 2014–15 LEN Euro Cup was the second tier of European competition in water polo. It ran from 30 October 2014 to 11 April 2015, and it was contested by twenty one teams from twelve countries.

Overview

Team allocation
CL: Transferred from the Champions League
Q2: Third and fourth-placed teams from the QR2
Q1: Sixth-placed teams from the QR1

Round and draw dates
The schedule of the competition is as follows.

Qualifying rounds

Qualification round I
10–12 October

Qualification round II
30 October-2 November
Twelve teams will take part in the quarter finals. They will be drawn into five groups of five or six teams, whose played on 30 October–2 November 2014. Group winners and runners-up teams of each group advance to quarter finals.

Group A
Vouliagmeni has the right to organize the tournament.

Group B
Valletta has the right to organize the tournament.

Group C
Olympic Nice has the right to organize the tournament.

Group D
Savona has the right to organize the tournament.

Knockout stage

Bracket

Quarter-finals
29 November 2014 1st match
17 December 2014 2nd match

These teams played against each other over two legs on a home-and-away basis. The mechanism of the draws for each round was as follow:
In the draw for the quarter finals, the four group winners were seeded, and the four group runners-up were unseeded. The seeded teams were drawn against the unseeded teams, with the seeded teams hosting the second leg. Teams from the same group or the same association could not be drawn against each other.
The first legs were played on 29 November, and the second legs were played on 17 December 2014.

|}

Semi-finals
The draw was held on 10 January 2015 in Belgrade, Serbia. The first legs were played on 11 February, and the second legs were played on 4 March 2015.

|}

Finals
The first leg were played on 28 March, and the second leg were played on 11 April 2015.

See also
2014–15 LEN Champions League

References

External links
LEN Euro Cup (official website)

LEN Euro Cup seasons
Euro Cup
2014 in water polo
2015 in water polo